Alicia Lekas is an American Republican politician. She serves in the New Hampshire House of Representatives in Hillsborough County - District 38 alongside Tony Lekas.

References 

Year of birth missing (living people)
Living people
21st-century American politicians
21st-century American women politicians
Republican Party members of the New Hampshire House of Representatives
People from Hillsborough County, New Hampshire

Women state legislators in New Hampshire